Sphaleractis eurysema is a moth in the family Gelechiidae. It was described by Edward Meyrick in 1904. It is found in Australia, where it has been recorded from New South Wales.

The forewings are light fuscous, darker above the middle and with a broad white costal streak from the base to five-sixths, strewn with black specks, the costal edge suffusedly fuscous from the middle to three-fourths. The stigmata are rather large, distinct and blackish, with the plical rather obliquely beyond the first discal, an additional dot midway between the second discal and dorsum. The hindwings are whitish grey.

References

Gelechiinae
Moths described in 1904